Carnegie is a Scottish surname. Notable people with the name include:

Andrew Carnegie (1835–1919), Scottish-American industrialist and philanthropist
Dale Carnegie (1888–1955), American motivational speaker and author
David Carnegie (entrepreneur) (1772–1837), Scottish-Swedish industrialist
David Carnegie (explorer) (1871–1900), British explorer in Western Australia
David Carnegie (RAF officer) (1897–1964), Royal Air Force commander during World War II
Dean Carnegie (born 1945), American magician
Herb Carnegie (1919–2012), Jamaican-Canadian hockey player and philanthropist
James Carnegie, 3rd Duke of Fife (1929–2015), British landowner and farmer
Mary Elizabeth Carnegie (1916–2008), American nurse and educator
Mike Carnegie (born 1984), Canadian lacrosse player
Sir Robin Carnegie (1926–2011), British Army general
Roderick Carnegie (born 1932), Australian businessman
Scott Carnegie (born 1985), Canadian lacrosse player
Earls of Northesk, surname Carnegie, 1662 to present
Earls of Southesk, surname Carnegie, 1575 to present

Scottish surnames
Surnames of Lowland Scottish origin